Hypatopa limae is a moth in the family Blastobasidae. It is found in Costa Rica.

The length of the forewings is about 10.5 mm. The forewings are pale reddish brown. The hindwings are translucent pale brown.

Etymology
The specific name is derived from Latin limae (meaning labor).

References

Moths described in 2013
Hypatopa